"Mendocino County Line" is a song written by Matt Serletic and Bernie Taupin, and recorded as a duet by American country music artists Willie Nelson and Lee Ann Womack. It was released in January 2002 as the lead-off single from  Nelson's album The Great Divide. It was a Top 40 hit on the U.S. country chart, peaking at number 22. It was Nelson's first Top 40 hit on that chart since "Ain't Necessarily So" in 1990. It won the Grammy Award for Best Country Collaboration.

Content
The song is a ballad about a love that couldn't last. The song references Mendocino County, California.

Critical reception
Deborah Evans Price, of Billboard magazine reviewed the song favorably, saying that when Womack sings the chorus, "there's a tender, almost epic feeling to her heartache." Regarding Nelson, she states that he "imbues each line with the kind of emotional integrity that has become his trademark." She concludes her review by calling the song "absolutely magical." Mario Tarradel of The Dallas Morning News described the song and wrote, "They do sound good together; their voices complement each other like leather softened by lace."

Music video
The music video was directed by Mark Seliger. It was not filmed anywhere near Mendocino County. Instead, it was filmed at Willie Nelson's Luck, Texas property.

Chart performance
"Mendocino County Line" debuted at number 53 on the U.S. Billboard Hot Country Singles & Tracks for the week of January 26, 2002.

References

2002 singles
2002 songs
Lee Ann Womack songs
Willie Nelson songs
Country ballads
Songs written by Matt Serletic
Song recordings produced by Matt Serletic
Songs with lyrics by Bernie Taupin
Lost Highway Records singles
Male–female vocal duets